"Neat Neat Neat" is the second single by English punk rock band the Damned, released on 18 February 1977 by Stiff Records, simultaneously with their debut studio album Damned Damned Damned.

The single was reissued in Stiff's Damned 4 Pack mail-order set. A CD version was issued in the Stiff Singles 1976-1977 box set  by Castle Music in 2003.

The single was also issued in Australia, Ireland, Japan (on Island Records) and New Zealand.

In 2005, Stylus Magazine ranked the song's bassline at No. 33 in their list of the "Top 50 Basslines of All Time".

Track listing
 "Neat Neat Neat" (James) - 2:44
 "Stab Yor Back" (Scabies)  - 1:01
 "Singalonga Scabies" (Scabies)  - 1:00

In other media
This song was featured in the video game True Crime: New York City.
The song can be heard playing on the jukebox in the Simpsons episode, "Love, Springfieldian Style", in the third segment, "Sid and Nancy" (a re-imagining of the film of the same name), just before a character played by Martin Prince changes it to the Bay City Rollers' "Saturday Night".
The song appeared in the 2017 film Baby Driver as the soundtrack to a heist and chase.
The song appeared in an episode of Amazon Prime's The Boys.

Covers
Elvis Costello and the Attractions covered the song. Their version originally appeared as the B-side on a 7" single included with early pressings of This Year's Model, and was later included as a bonus track on Rhino's 2002 CD reissue of that album.
Melt-Banana covered the song in the pregap before the first track on the CD version of Charlie.
For 5 shows during their World Contamination Tour, My Chemical Romance covered the song.

Production credits
 Producers:
 Nick Lowe
 Musicians:
 Dave Vanian − vocals
 Brian James − guitar
 Captain Sensible − bass		
 Rat Scabies − drums

References

External links

1977 singles
The Damned (band) songs
Song recordings produced by Nick Lowe
Songs written by Brian James (guitarist)
1977 songs